Federated Group was an American chain of consumer electronics retail stores with 67 stores in California, Texas, Arizona, and Kansas. The company was founded by Wilfred Schwartz in 1970 and opened the first deep discount consumer electronics "superstore" in the United States. In 1987, Federated Group was the fourth-largest discounter of consumer electronics in the U.S. Its company headquarters were in City of Commerce, California and later in Sunnyvale, California. Federated Group was sold in 1987 to Atari and sold again in 1989 to Silo.

History
Federated Group was started by Wilfred Schwartz in 1970 when he bought a 25,000-square-foot warehouse in Los Angeles from an electronics company and turned part of it into a retail store. In 1976, Federated Group closed two stores and built a 20,000-square-foot "superstore" in Westminster, California. The company expanded quickly and launched a major expansion into Texas in December 1984. 
The timing of the expansion into Texas hurt Federated Group since the state was experiencing an economic slowdown from the oil bust. In Federated Group's home territory of Los Angeles, the competition was increasing due to the entrance of Circuit City into the market in 1985.

Federated Group began to lose money in August 1987, so Schwartz decided to sell the company to Atari for US$67.3 million.

Atari
Atari purchased Federated Group to gain retail shelf space since many retailers had shunned the company’s products after being hurt by the collapse of Atari’s video game business. The deal made sense for Atari since Federated Group could provide their expertise to sell more computers.  In 1988, Atari filed a lawsuit claiming that it was defrauded of US$43 million when it bought Federated Group. The lawsuit charged that Wilfred Schwartz and other Federated Group officers conspired to misrepresent the value of the company’s assets.

In November 1989, Atari agreed to sell 26 Federated Group stores in Los Angeles and San Diego to Silo after announcing a loss of nearly US$85 million earlier that year. The remaining stores began liquidation sales in December 1989 and were closed four to five months later.

Silo
Silo opened stores in San Diego in 1976 and had been looking for an opportunity to expand into the Los Angeles market. Federated Group's 21 stores in Los Angeles and Orange counties and five stores in San Diego were reopened under the Silo name in 1990.

In January 1994, Silo closed nine former Federated Group stores in Los Angeles, the same year that Best Buy later entered the market. Silo filed for bankruptcy in December 1995 and closed all of its stores.

Advertising
Shadoe Stevens began playing the "Fred R. Rated" character for Federated Group in 1982 and eventually appeared in more than 1,000 commercials. In 1986, Stevens told viewers that rabid frogs had eaten the company's warehouse and they were passing the savings on to the customers. Sales went up by 30 percent after that spot and Federated Group nominated itself for Adweek magazine's annual "Bad Advertising" issue.

After losing some share of the Southern California market to Circuit City in 1987, Federated Group began to tone down much of its Fred Rated advertising and began looking for a new image.

References 

Companies based in Los Angeles
Retail companies disestablished in 1989
Defunct companies based in California
Defunct retail companies of the United States
Defunct consumer electronics retailers in the United States
Retail companies established in 1970
1970 establishments in California
Consumer electronics retailers in the United States
1986 disestablishments in California